Jo-Anne Faull and Julie Richardson were the defending champions, but Richardson did not compete this year.

Faull teamed up with Jo-Anne Faull and lost in the final 6–4, 6–2 against Yayuk Basuki and Nana Miyagi.

Draw

Draw

References

External links
 Official results archive (ITF)

Taipei Women's Championship
Taipei Women's Championship
Taipei Women's Championship, 1993